The Pakistani cricket team toured South Africa from 1 February to 24 March 2013. The tour consisted of two Twenty20 Internationals (T20Is), three Test matches and five One Day Internationals (ODIs). South Africa announced their summer schedule of January–March in which they replaced their traditional Boxing Day Test with a T20I for the 2012–13 home season, during which they hosted New Zealand and Pakistan.

During the third ODI, Hashim Amla and AB de Villiers set a new world record for the third-wicket, with a partnership of 238 runs. This beat the previous record of 237 set by Rahul Dravid and Sachin Tendulkar against Kenya in 1999.

Squads

Notes
 1 Tanvir Ahmed and Rahat Ali have been called for the tour considering the fast bowling conditions there.
 2 Imran Tahir has been added to the squad for first test as cover for the injured Robin Peterson.
 3 Imran Farhat has been called to replace Taufeeq Umar who would fly back to Pakistan due to an injury.
 4 Haris Sohail flew back to Pakistan due to an injury.
 5 Kyle Abbott was included in the squad for the third Test in place of the injured Morne Morkel.

Tour Matches

First Class : Pakistanis v SA Invitational XI

Two-day : Pakistanis v Emerging Cape Cobras

List A : Pakistanis v SA Invitational XI

Test series

1st Test

2nd Test

3rd Test

T20I series

1st T20I

2nd T20I

ODI series

1st ODI

2nd ODI

3rd ODI

4th ODI

5th ODI

Broadcasters

References

External links 
 

2012-13
2013 in Pakistani cricket
International cricket competitions in 2012–13
2013 in South African cricket
South African cricket seasons from 2000–01